The 1997 Baylor Bears football team (variously "Baylor", "BU", or the "Bears") represented Baylor University in the 1997 NCAA Division I-A football season. They were represented in the Big 12 Conference in the South Division. They played their home games at Floyd Casey Stadium in Waco, Texas. They were coached by head coach Dave Roberts.

Schedule

References

Baylor
Baylor Bears football seasons
Baylor Bears football